Lieutenant General Sir Edward Hopton  (7 February 1837 – 19 January 1912) was a British Army officer who became Lieutenant Governor of Jersey.

Early life
Hopton was born in 1837 in Bishops Frome, Herefordshire, the eldest son of the Reverend W.P. Hopton and his wife, Diana. He was educated at Eton College and joined the Army in 1854.

Military career
Hopton was commissioned into the 79th Foot. He fought at the Siege of Sevastapol during the Crimean War and at the Siege of Lucknow during the Indian Mutiny and then served with the Connaught Rangers during the 9th Xhosa War of 1877 to 1878. He was promoted lieutenant-colonel on 18 December 1880, colonel on 11 November 1882, major-general on 1 April 1892, and lieutenant-general on 19 December 1898. After the death of the previous holder, he was on 15 January 1900 appointed regimental colonel of the Connaught Rangers.

Hopton was appointed Lieutenant Governor of Jersey in 1895, and thus also in command of the troops on the island. During the Second Boer War he had some difficulty maintaining order on Jersey in the face of Pro-Boer attitudes of some of the French Islanders.

In retirement, he became Deputy Lieutenant of Herefordshire.

Family
In 1874, he married Clare Ellen Trafford; they had two sons and two daughters.

References

1837 births
1912 deaths
British Army lieutenant generals
Knights Commander of the Order of the Bath
Deputy Lieutenants of Herefordshire
English justices of the peace
Connaught Rangers officers
Governors of Jersey
British Army personnel of the Crimean War
British military personnel of the Indian Rebellion of 1857
88th Regiment of Foot (Connaught Rangers) officers